The Deutscher Schachbund (DSB) was founded in Leipzig on 18 July, 1877. When the next meeting took place in the Schützenhaus on 15 July 1879, sixty-two clubs had become member of the chess federation. Hofrat Rudolf von Gottschall became Chairman and Hermann Zwanziger the General Secretary. Twelve players participated in the master tournament of Leipzig 1879.

Masters' Tournament 

{| class="sortable wikitable"
! # !!Year !!City !! Winner
|-
| 1 || 1879 || Leipzig ||  /  Czech Silesia
|-
| 2 || 1881 || Berlin ||  /  
|-
| 3 || 1883 || Nuremberg ||  / 
|-
| 4 || 1885 || Hamburg ||  / 
|-
| 5 || 1887 || Frankfurt ||  / 
|-
| 6 || 1889 || Breslau ||  /  Prussian Silesia
|-
| 7 || 1892 || Dresden ||  /  Prussian Silesia
|-
| 8 || 1893 || Kiel ||  /    /  
|-
| 9 || 1894 || Leipzig ||  /  Prussian Silesia
|-
| 10 || 1896 || Eisenach ||  / 
|-
| 11 || 1898 || Cologne ||  / 
|-
| 12 || 1900 || Munich ||  /    /    / 
|-
| 13 || 1902 || Hannover ||  / 
|-
| 14 || 1904 || Coburg ||  /    /    / 
|-
| 15 || 1906 || Nuremberg ||  / 
|-
| 16 || 1908 || Düsseldorf ||  / 
|-
| 17 || 1910 || Hamburg ||  / 
|-
| 18 || 1912 || Breslau ||  /    / 
|-
| 19 || 1914 || Mannheim ||  / 
|-
| 20 || 1920 || Berlin ||  / 
|-
| 21 || 1921 || Hamburg ||  / 
|-
| 22 || 1922 || Oeynhausen ||  / 
|-
| 23 || 1923 || Frankfurt ||  / 
|-
| 24 || 1925 || Breslau ||  / 
|-
| 25 || 1927 || Magdeburg ||  / 
|-
| 26 || 1929 || Duisburg ||  / 
|-
| 27 || 1931 || Swinemünde ||  /    / 
|-
| 28 || 1932 || Bad Ems ||  / 
|}

Hauptturnier A 

{| class="sortable wikitable"
! # !!Year !!City !! Winner
|-
| 1 || 1879 || Leipzig || –
|-
| 2 || 1881 || Berlin ||  /  
|-
| 3 || 1883 || Nuremberg ||  /  Prussian Silesia
|-
| 4 || 1885 || Hamburg ||  / 
|-
| 5 || 1887 || Frankfurt ||  / 
|-
| 6 || 1889 || Breslau ||  /  East Brandenburg
|-
| 7 || 1892 || Dresden ||  / 
|-
| 8 || 1893 || Kiel ||  / 
|-
| 9 || 1894 || Leipzig ||  / 
|-
| 10 || 1896 || Eisenach ||  / 
|-
| 11 || 1898 || Cologne ||  /  
|-
| 12 || 1900 || Munich ||  /  
|-
| 13 || 1902 || Hannover ||  / 
|-
| 14 || 1904 || Coburg ||  /  
|-
| 15 || 1906 || Nuremberg ||  / 
|-
| 16 || 1908 || Düsseldorf ||  / 
|-
| 17 || 1910 || Hamburg ||  / 
|-
| 18 || 1912 || Breslau ||  /  
|-
| 19 || 1914 || Mannheim ||  / 
|}

See also 
Silesian Chess Congress
German Chess Championship
List of strong chess tournaments

References 

Chess competitions
Chess in Germany
1879 establishments in Germany